Mady is a given name and a surname(rarely it may also be used as a nickname). It is considered to be a unisex name.

Given name

Women
 Mady Berry (1887–1965), French stage and film actress
 Mady Christians (1892–1951), Austrian-born German actress
 Mady Correll (1907–1981), Canadian-American actress
 Mady Delvaux-Stehres (born 1950), Luxembourgian politician
 Mady Hornig (born 1957), American psychiatrist and associate professor of epidemiology
 Mady Mesplé (1931–2020), French opera singer
 Mady Rahl (1915–2009), German actress
 Mady Villiers (born 1998), English cricketer

Men
 Mady Camara (born 1997), Guinean footballer
 Mady Sissoko (born 2000), Malian basketball player

Surname
 Abou Elela Mady (born 1952), Egyptian engineer and politician
 Lamar Mady (born 1990), American football player
 Levente Mady (born 1959), Canadian swimmer

See also
 Maddy, a given name
 Maddy (surname)
Unisex name
Maddie

Unisex given names